Count Leopoldo Cicognara (17 November 1767, in Ferrara – 5 March 1834, in Venice) was an Italian artist, art collector, art historian and bibliophile.

Early life, education, and political career
Cicognara attended the Collegio dei Nobili in Modena from 1776 to 1785. From 1788-1790, he attended the Societá dell'Arcadia in Rome where he studied painting under Jacob Philipp Hackert and Domenico Corvi. There he also became interested in art criticism and archeology. He later he visited Naples and Sicily, and published one of his first works of poetry in Palermo. Cicognara studied archeology during travels to Florence, Milan, Bologna and Venice.

In 1795, he moved to Modena and began a brief political career, becoming a member of the legislative body, serving as a councilor of state, and minister plenipotentiary of the Cisalpine Republic at Turin. Napoleon decorated him with the Iron Crown.

Academic career and scholarship
Cicognara left politics in 1805 to devote himself to art history. He settled in Venice and in 1808 was made president of the Accademia di Belle Arti di Venezia, a post in which he worked until 1826. He was influential in opening the Galleria dell’Accademia to the public in 1817, increasing the number of the professors at the academy, improving the curriculum, and establishing prizes.

In 1808, his treatise Del bello regionamenti was published, which he dedicated to Napoleon. Wilhelm Schlegel advised Cicognara on his magnum opus, the Storia della scultura dal suo risorgimento in Italia al secolo di Napoleone, The book was designed to complete the works of Winckelmann and D'Agincourt and is illustrated with 180 plates.

In 1814, after the fall of Napoleon, Cicognara was patronized by Francis I of Austria, and between 1815 and 1820 published, under the auspices of that sovereign, his Fabbriche più cospicue di Venezia, two folios, containing some 150 plates. Charged by the Venetians with the presentation of their gifts to the Princess Caroline Augusta of Bavaria at Vienna, Cicognara added to the offering an illustrated catalogue of the objects it comprised; this book, Omaggio delle Provincie Venete alla maestri Carolina Augusta, has since become of great value to bibliophiles.

The other works by Cicognara are the Memorie storiche de litterati ed artisti Ferraresi (1811); the Vite de' più insigni pittori e scultori Ferraresi, MS.; the Memorie spettanti alla storia della calcografia (1831); and a large number of dissertations on painting, sculpture, engraving and other kindred subjects.

In 1833, he was elected into the National Academy of Design as an Honorary Academician.

Cicognara Library 
During his career, Cicognara collected about five thousand volumes on art and archeology, an important resource for scholars. In 1821 he published at Pisa a well-known catalog of his collection, the result of thirty years labor, the Catalogo ragionato de’ libri d’arte e di antichità. In 1824 his library was purchased en bloc by Pope Leo XII, and added to the Vatican library.

Philipp Fehl and Raina Fehl were the directors of The Leopoldo Cicognara Program at the University of Illinois Library, dedicated to the study and promulgation of literary sources in the history of art, 1987–2007.  They cataloged the collection of work found in the Fondo Cicognara at the Vatican Library.

The Digital Cicognara Library is a collaborative project aiming to create an online version of the Fondo Cicognara by digitizing each title in the collection.

List of works
 Le belle arti (Ferrara: Per gli eredi di G. Rinaldi, 1790)
 Lettera ad un amico su di alcune attuali controversie giudiciarie e su diverse opinioni degli eruditi intorno al Panteon di M. Agrippa detto la Rotonda (Pisa: Impresso co' caratteri di Firmino Didot, 1807)
 Del bello: Ragionamenti (Florence and Pisa, 1808)
 Storia della scultura dal suo risorgimento in Italia sino al secolo di Napoleone per servire di continuazione alle opere di Winckelmann e di d’Agincourt. Vol. 1, Vol. 2, Vol. 3 (Venice: Venezia: Nella tipografia Picotti, 1813)
 De' propilei e della inutilità e dei danni dei perni metallici nella costruzione degli edifizii (Venice: Nella Tip. di Alvisopoli, 1814)
 Le fabbriche più cospicue di Venezia... (Venice, 1815–1820)
 Catalogo ragionato de’ libri d’arte e di antichità (Pisa: N. Capurro, co'caratteri di F. Didot, 1821)
 Biografia di Antonio Canova, aggiuntivi il catalogo completo delle opere (Venice: G. Missiaglia, 1823)
 Storia della scultura dal suo risorgimento in Italia fino al secolo di Canova: fino al secolo di Canova. Vol. 1, Vol. 2, Vol. 3, Vol. 4, Vol. 5, Vol. 6, Vol. 7, Vol. 8 (Prato: Frat. Giachetti, 1823–1825)
 Memorie spettanti alla storia della calcografia (Prato, 1831)

References

External links 

Leopoldo Cicognara at arthistoricum.net 
"Cicognara, Leopoldo, Conte" in Dictionary of Art Historians.

1767 births
1834 deaths
Writers from Ferrara
Italian archaeologists
Italian art historians
Academic staff of the Accademia di Belle Arti di Venezia